Pyrgus jupei, the Caucasian skipper, is a butterfly of the family Hesperiidae. It was described by Buchard Alberti in 1967. It is found in the Caucasus, Turkey and northern Iran. The habitat consists of alpine and subalpine meadow belts.

Adults are on wing from the end of June to August.

References

 Butterflies of Turkey

External links
 Butterfly Conservation Armenia

Butterflies described in 1967
Pyrgus